Sergei Vadimovich Stepashin (born 2 March 1952) is a Russian politician who briefly served as Prime Minister of Russia in 1999. Prior to this he had been appointed as federal security minister by President Boris Yeltsin in 1994, a position from which he resigned in 1995 as a consequence of the Budyonnovsk hospital hostage crisis. Subsequent to his tenure as Prime Minister he served as Chairman of the Accounts Chamber of Russia from 2000 until 2013.

Early life and education
Stepashin was born in Port-Arthur, Kvantun Oblast, USSR (now Lüshunkou, China) on 2 March 1952. He graduated from the Higher Political School of the USSR Ministry of the Interior (1973), in 1981 from the Lenin Military-Political Academy, and in 2002 from the Finance Academy. He is a Doctor of Law, Professor, and has a rank of the State Advisor on Justice of the Russian Federation. His military rank is colonel general.

Career
Stepashin served as the Head of the FSK (the predecessor of the FSB) from February 1994 until June 1995. He then became justice minister, serving from 1997 to March 1998, and interior minister, holding that office from March 1998 to May 1999, when he was appointed and confirmed by parliament as prime minister. Yeltsin made it fairly clear when he appointed him Prime Minister that Stepashin would only hold the position temporarily, and he was replaced in August 1999 by future president Vladimir Putin.

Stepashin's attitude towards the Chechen conflict was markedly different from that of Vladimir Putin. Stepashin had, for example, presented leaders of the separatist regime in Chechnya with monogrammed pistols, praised the activities of the religious extremists who had taken over several Dagestani villages, and had proclaimed publicly: "We can afford to lose Dagestan!".

After having been fired from the position of Prime Minister, Stepashin joined the political party Yabloko for the Russian parliamentary elections of 1999 and was elected to the State Duma, the lower house of the Russian parliament. Later on he resigned his parliamentary seat and became head of the Account Chamber of the Russian Federation, the federal audit agency. He holds his job to date.

Most recently, he has been asked by lawyers for Hermitage Capital, once among Russia's top foreign investors, to investigate what it says was a series of fake tax refunds which defrauded Russian taxpayers of 11.2 billion roubles ($382 million), according to lawyers Brown Rudnick in a letter to Stepashin.

Since 2007, Stepashin is the head of the revived Imperial Orthodox Palestine Society.

Honours and awards
 Order of Merit for the Fatherland;
2nd class (2 March 2007) - for outstanding contribution to the strengthening and development of state financial control, and many years of honest work
3rd class (2 March 2002) - for great contribution to strengthening Russian statehood and many years of conscientious service
4th class (28 February 2012)
 Order of Courage (28 December 1998) - for his great personal contribution to strengthening the rule of law and order, displaying courage and dedication
 Medal "For Distinguished Service to the Public Order"
 Medal "For Distinction in Military Service", 1st and 2nd classes
 Commander of the Legion of Honour (France)
 Commander 1st Class of the Order of the Polar Star (Sweden)
 Order of Diplomatic Service Merit, 1st class (Republic of Korea, 2004)
 Order of St. Seraphim of Sarov (Russian Orthodox Church);
1st class (2009) - in consideration of his work for the restoration of Volsk cathedral 
2nd class (2006) - for his contribution to the restoration of Holy Transfiguration Monastery in Murom
 Order of the Commonwealth (CIS Interparliamentary Assembly)
 Diploma of the Government of the Russian Federation (2 October 2006) - for his great personal contribution to the development and strengthening of public financial control, more efficient use of the federal budget
 Honour of the State Duma of the Russian Federation "For merits in development of parliamentarism" (2006)
 Honorary Citizen of Murom (2006)
 Order of Saint Nicholas the Wonderworker, 1st class (Russian Imperial House)
 Honorary Doctor of the Diplomatic Academy of Russia (25 October 2011)
 Order the "Community"

References

External links

A biography of Stepashin by V. Pribylovsky (in Russian)
Sergei Stepashin at Armen Oganesyan's talkshow "Vis-a-Vis with the World" (in English)
Sergei Stepashin at Armen Oganesyan's talkshow "Vis-a-Vis with the World" (in Russian)

1952 births
Interior ministers of Russia
Justice ministers of Russia
Living people
KGB officers
Heads of government of the Russian Federation
Third convocation members of the State Duma (Russian Federation)
Recipients of the Order "For Merit to the Fatherland", 2nd class
Recipients of the Order "For Merit to the Fatherland", 3rd class
Recipients of the Order of Courage
Commandeurs of the Légion d'honneur
Commanders First Class of the Order of the Polar Star
Directors of the Federal Security Service
Lenin Military Political Academy alumni
Financial University under the Government of the Russian Federation alumni